191 North Wacker is a 516 ft (157m) tall skyscraper in Chicago, Illinois.  It was constructed from 2000 to 2002 and has 37 floors, 14 elevators, and 737,759 square feet of floor space. Kohn Pedersen Fox Associates designed the building, which is the 77th tallest in Chicago. Tenants include LSC Communications.

See also 
 List of tallest buildings in Chicago

References 
 
 Chicago Architecture

Skyscraper office buildings in Chicago
Office buildings completed in 2002
2002 establishments in Illinois
Kohn Pedersen Fox buildings
Leadership in Energy and Environmental Design gold certified buildings